Poborzans, also spelled as Pobożans, is an ethnographic group of Polish people, that are part of the ethnographic subgroup of Masovians. They originate from the north west Masovia, located within the region of Poborze and Zawkrze, to the north of Mława river. The group is descendant of the Polish nobility that had inhabit the area in the Late Middle Ages. They are culturally separate from the neighbouring groups.

Notes

References 

Lechites
Polish people
Slavic ethnic groups
Ethnic groups in Poland
Masovia